The Poro, or Purrah or Purroh, is a men's secret society in Sierra Leone, Liberia, Guinea, and the Ivory Coast, introduced by the Mane people. It is sometimes referred to as a hunting society and only males are admitted to its ranks. The female counterpart of the Poro society is the Sande society.

Structure

The Poro society was part of the culture introduced by Mane people, migrants to the region as early as 1000 AD.

Two affiliated and secret associations exist in Sierra Leone, the Yassi and the Bundu. The first is nominally reserved for females, but members of the Poro are admitted to certain ceremonies. All the female members of the Yassi must be also members of the Bundu, which is strictly reserved to women. In Liberia, the female equivalent of the Poro is the Sande society.

Of the three, the Poro is by far the most important. The entire native population is governed by its code of laws. It primarily represents a type of fraternal society to which even infants are temporarily admitted. The ceremony for them consists of carrying them into the Poro bush and out again.

There are also religious and civil aspects of the Poro. Under the former, boys join it at puberty in a rite of passage. Under its civil aspects, the society serves as a kind of native governing body, making laws, deciding on war and peace, etc.

Cultural context 
In Culture and Customs of Liberia (2006) by Ayodeji Olukoju, the place of the Poro society in Liberian life is examined. "Liberian religious culture is characterised by a predisposition towards secrecy (encapsulated in the concept of ifa mo - "do not speak it") and an ingrained belief in the intervention of mysterious forces in human affairs". "Both elite and non-elite Liberians usually attribute events to the activities of secret powers and forces."

"Beliefs include the conviction that there are deep and hidden things about an individual that only diviners, priests, and other qualified persons can unravel. This presupposes that whatever exists or happens in the physical realm has foundations in the spirit world".

Social function 

One of the social functions of secret societies like the Poro and Sande is to deter antisocial behavior or beliefs. Poro elders will determine cases of alleged witchcraft in the community.

Practices
The Poro society has its own special rituals and language, tattooing, and symbols. Details are scarce, due to an oath of secrecy.

Meetings 
The Poro society usually meets in the dry season, between the months of October and May. The rendezvous is in the bush, at an enclosure, separated into apartments by mats and roofed only by the overhanging trees, serving as a club-house. There are three grades, the first for chiefs and big men, the second for fetish-priests and the third for the crowd. The ceremonies of the Poro are presided over by the Poro devil, a man in fetish dress, who addresses the meeting through a long tube of wood.

The wearing of wooden masks in Poro society masquerades is a representation of the spirit world of benign and malevolent spirits.
"The ceremonies of the Purrah are presided over by the Poro devil, a man in fetish dress, who addresses the meeting through a long tube of wood, known as a bull-roarer (voice distorter which delivers a bloodcurdling stream of sounds, and is made from a tube with holes cut into it over which discs of membrane from the egg sacks of a particular spider are spread over)." The Liberian Poro is little different when it comes to ceremonies. 

If a ceremony has women, children and non-members taking part, the devil stays out. The Gbetoo is the only "fetish dressed up with long tube of wood" that can be seen. The poro devil is invisible even to most members.

Taboo 

The Poro can place its taboo on anything or anybody. As no member would defy its order, much trouble has been caused where the taboo has been laid upon crops. In 1897 the British local government was compelled to pass a special ordinance forbidding the imposition of the taboo on all indigenous products.

Other activities 
In 2009, rock-throwing Poro members protested the selection of Elizabeth Simbiwa Sogbo-Tortu as the first female chief of the Nimiyama Chiefdom in eastern Sierra Leone. They barred her from taking office.

Activity by country

Liberia
During his rule, Charles Taylor is reported to have coopted the Poro Society, which helped him project an aura of mystery and invincibility.

See also 
 Sande society
 Leopard Society
 Crocodile Society
 Secret society

References

Additional reading
 Tim Butcher. Chasing the Devil - The Search for Africa's Fighting Spirit. Chatto & Windus, 2010. 
 P. Jan Vandenhoute. "Poro and Mask : A Few Comments on 'Masks as agents of social control in Northeast Liberia' by Dr. G.W. Harley." Working Papers in Ethnic Art, 4. State University of Ghent, 1989. 

Society of Sierra Leone
Society of Liberia
Society of Guinea
Religion in Sierra Leone
Religion in Liberia
Religion in Guinea
African secret societies